"Thinking About You" is a song by Dutch DJ and record producer Hardwell, featuring English singer Jay Sean. It was released as a digital download on 14 October 2016 by Sony Music.

Music video
A one-minute snippet preview of the song is released on Hardwell's official YouTube channel on 14 October 2016. The music video for the song was filmed in Amsterdam, Netherlands. The music video was released on 28 October 2016 on Hardwell's YouTube official channel. It features Candice Heiden as the main skater. A lyrics video of the song is also released, it features Amanda Reifer of Cover Drive.

Track listing

Credits
 Producer – Hardwell, Trackside
 Vocals – Jay Sean
 Lyrics – Jaap Reesema and Joren Van Der Voort
 Label: Sony

Charts

Release history

References

2016 singles
2016 songs
Jay Sean songs
Hardwell songs
Songs written by Hardwell